Five Falls Reservoir is a man-made lake located on the Raquette River east of South Colton, New York. Fish species present in the reservoir are smallmouth bass, white sucker, northern pike, yellow perch, rock bass, and walleye. There is a boat launch located on the southwest shore off Three Falls Lane.

References 

Reservoirs in St. Lawrence County, New York